In Haven (Capri) is a poem by Caroline Alice Elgar, probably best known in its musical setting as the second (and shortest) song composed by her husband Edward Elgar for his song-cycle Sea Pictures.

History 
Elgar first set Alice's poem to music for voice and piano in 1897 and it was published in a cultural magazine "The Dome" in 1898, with the title "Love alone will stay". Alice then adapted it for Sea Pictures: she re-ordered the verses, included more allusions to the sea, and it was renamed "In Haven".

Words

Elgar's setting 
In the third verse, violins are added to the vocal line. It concludes with an upward scale on the violins and a pizzicato on the lower strings.

Recordings 
As well as the recordings listed in the Sea Pictures article, In Haven has been recorded by Robert Meadmore.

References 

English poems
Songs by Edward Elgar
1897 songs